The 2007 Tour de Wallonie was the 34th edition of the Tour de Wallonie cycle race and was held from 28 July to 1 August 2007. The race started in Haccourt and finished in Barvaux. The race was won by Borut Božič.

General classification

References

Tour de Wallonie
Tour de Wallonie